In mathematics, a classification theorem answers the classification problem "What are the objects of a given type, up to some equivalence?". It gives a non-redundant enumeration: each object is equivalent to exactly one class.

A few issues related to classification are the following.

The equivalence problem is "given two objects, determine if they are equivalent".
A complete set of invariants, together with which invariants are  solves the classification problem, and is often a step in solving it.
A  (together with which invariants are realizable) solves both the classification problem and the equivalence problem.
 A canonical form solves the classification problem, and is more data: it not only classifies every class, but provides a distinguished (canonical) element of each class.

There exist many classification theorems in mathematics, as described below.

Geometry
 Classification of Euclidean plane isometries
 Classification theorems of surfaces
 Classification of two-dimensional closed manifolds
 Enriques–Kodaira classification of algebraic surfaces (complex dimension two, real dimension four)
 Nielsen–Thurston classification which characterizes homeomorphisms of a compact surface
 Thurston's eight model geometries, and the geometrization conjecture
 Berger classification
 Classification of Riemannian symmetric spaces
 Classification of 3-dimensional lens spaces
 Classification of manifolds

Algebra
 Classification of finite simple groups
 Classification of Abelian groups
 Classification of Finitely generated abelian group
 Classification of Rank 3 permutation group
 Classification of 2-transitive permutation groups
 Artin–Wedderburn theorem — a classification theorem for semisimple rings
 Classification of Clifford algebras
 Classification of low-dimensional real Lie algebras
 Bianchi classification
 ADE classification
Langlands classification

Linear algebra
 Finite-dimensional vector spaces (by dimension)
 Rank–nullity theorem (by rank and nullity)
 Structure theorem for finitely generated modules over a principal ideal domain
 Jordan normal form
 Sylvester's law of inertia

Analysis
 Classification of discontinuities

Complex analysis
 Classification of Fatou components

Mathematical physics
 Classification of electromagnetic fields
 Petrov classification
 Segre classification
 Wigner's classification

See also
 Representation theorem
List of manifolds

Mathematical theorems
Mathematical classification systems